The 1930–31 IHL season was the second season of the International Hockey League, a minor professional ice hockey league in the Midwestern and Eastern United States and Canada. Seven teams participated in the league, and the Windsor Bulldogs won the championship.

Regular season

Playoffs

External links
Season on hockeydb.com

1930 in ice hockey
1931 in ice hockey